Aphonopelma saguaro is a species of spiders in the family Theraphosidae, found in United States (Arizona).

References

saguaro
Spiders described in 2016
Endemic fauna of Arizona
Spiders of the United States